PNRA may refer to:
 National Antarctic Research Program, the Italian Antarctic research program
 Pakistan Nuclear Regulatory Authority, Pakistan's federal agency responsible for nuclear regulation
 Panera Bread, a chain of bakery-café fast casual restaurants